Rise or RISE may refer to:

Arts, entertainment, and media

Fictional entities
 Rise: The Vieneo Province, an internet-based virtual world
 Rise FM, a fictional radio station in the video game Grand Theft Auto 3
 Rise Kujikawa, a video game character from Persona 4

Films
Rise, a 2011 film with Andrew Stevens
 Rise (2014 film), an Australian film
 Fantastic Four: Rise of the Silver Surfer, often abbreviated as "Rise" in promotional material
 Rise: Blood Hunter, a 2007 horror/thriller film directed by Sebastian Gutierrez
 Rise (2022 film), an American biographical sports-drama film
 Rise (2022 French film), a French comedy drama film

Music

Albums

 Rise (Herb Alpert album), 1979
 Rise (Annabelle Chvostek album), 2012
 Rise (The Answer album), 2006
 Rise (Army of Me EP), a 2006 EP by Army of Me
 Rise (Bad Brains album), 1993
 Rise (Daryl Braithwaite album), 1990
 Rise (Building 429 album)
 Rise (Danny Gokey album), 2017
 Rise (Gabrielle album), 1999
Rise (Hollywood Vampires album), 2019
 Rise (Samantha James album), 2007
 Rise (Lane 8 album), 2015
 Rise (Nosferatu album), 1993
 Rise (Mike Peters album), 1998
 Rise (René & Angela album), 1983
Rise (Revolution Saints album), 2020
 Rise (RSO EP), a 2017 EP by RSO (Richie Sambora and )
 Rise (Shaggy album), 2012
 Rise (Anoushka Shankar album), 2005
 Rise (Skillet album), 2013
 Rise (A Skylit Drive album), 2013
 Rise (Speed album), 1998
 Rise (Taeyang album), 2014
 Rise (The Texas Tenors album), 2017
 Rise (Joy Tobing album), 2005
 Rise (The Rasmus album), 2022
 Rise, a 2008 album by Anew Revolution
 Rise, a 2021 EP by Kingfisher Sky
 Rise, a 1982 EP by Boyd Rice under the name NON

Songs

 "Rise" (instrumental), a 1979 composition from the same-named Herb Alpert album
 "Rise" (Eddie Amador song), 2000
 "Rise" (Jonas Blue song),  2018
 "Rise" (Daryl Braithwaite song), 1990
 "Rise" (Flobots song), 2008
 "Rise" (Gabrielle song),  2000
 "Rise" (Danny Gokey song), 2016
 "Rise" (Into a Circle song), 1985
 "Rise" (Samantha James song), 2006
 "Rise" (Katy Perry song),  2016
 "Rise" (Public Image Ltd song), 1986
 "Rise", a 2012 promotional single by the McClain Sisters
 "Rise", a 2018 promotional single for the 2018 League of Legends World Championship
 "Rise", a song by Baboon from We Sing and Play
 "Rise", a song by Bleeding Through from Portrait of the Goddess
"Rise", a song by Boyzone from BZ20
 "Rise", a song by The Cult from Beyond Good and Evil
 "Rise", a song by Disturbed from Believe
 "Rise", a song by Doves from Lost Souls
 "Rise", a song by Selena Gomez from Revival
 "Rise", a song by Alison Moyet from Hoodoo
 "Rise", a song by Gojira from Terra Incognita
 "Rise", a song by Lost Frequencies, 2021
 "Rise", a song by Origa from Ghost in the Shell: Stand Alone Complex O.S.T. 2
 "Rise", a song by Pantera from Vulgar Display of Power
 "Rise", a song by The Rasmus from Rise (The Rasmus album)
 "Rise", a song by Reks from Grey Hairs
 "Rise", a song by Sixx:A.M. from Prayers for the Damned
 "Rise", a song by Skillet from Rise
 "Rise", a song by Eddie Vedder from Into the Wild
 "Rise", a song by Hans Zimmer from The Dark Knight Rises

Other uses in music
 Rise, a type of melodic motion
 Rise, an alias used by Paul Oakenfold and Steve Osborne
 R.I.S.E. or RISE, an alternative name used by the band Rising Appalachia
 Rise: London United, an annual anti-racism music festival held in London
 Rise Records, a record label
 Kwon Ri-se, a South Korean singer

Television
Rise (American TV series), a 2018 American drama television series
 Rise (Canadian TV series), a 2017 Canadian documentary television series
 "Rise" (Star Trek: Voyager), the nineteenth episode of the third season of Star Trek: Voyager
 RI:SE, a breakfast television show in the UK

Other uses in arts, entertainment, and media
 RISE (kickboxing), a Japanese kickboxing promotion
 RISE (magazine), a former high school sports magazine owned by ESPN
 RISE (professional wrestling), a professional wrestling stable
 RISE (sculpture) a Belfast public art sculpture by Wolfgang Buttresss

Organizations
 Rise (non-governmental organization), an American civil rights organization for sexual assault survivors
 Criminal Sanctions Agency, abbreviated Rise, a Finnish government agency
 Research Institutes of Sweden (RISE), a network of Swedish state-owned research and technology organisations
 RISE – Scotland's Left Alliance, a Scottish eco-socialist party
 RISE (Ireland), a democratic socialist organisation
 Rise Technology, a short lived microprocessor manufacturer

Places
 Rise, Agder, a village in Arendal municipality in Agder county, Norway
 Rise Station, a railway station at Rise in Arendal municipality in Agder county, Norway
 Rise, East Riding of Yorkshire, a village and civil parish in Yorkshire, England
 Rise Bar, sometimes called simply Rise, a gay bar in New York City

Technology
 CFM International RISE, an in-development open rotor aircraft engine
 RiSE (robot), a climbing robot developed by Boston Dynamics
 Mitsubishi RISE, Mitsubishi Motors' patented safety body construction system
 RISE Editor, RISE to Bloome Software's system development software for model-driven engineering
 RISE-PAK, Relief and Information Systems for Earthquakes Pakistan, a website
 Rotation and Interior Structure Experiment, a radio science experiment by the InSight Mars lander

Other uses
 Rise: A Feminist Book Project, a list of books
 Rise (perfume), endorsed by Beyoncé
RISE awards (Recognising Inspirational Scientists and Engineers), awarded by the Engineering and Physical Sciences Research Council
 Rise, the appearance of a celestial object in the sky, such as sunrise
 Proofing (baking technique), the step stage of bread making
 Rise shaving cream, an American brand involved in advertising case law

See also
 Ascend (disambiguation)
 Rice (disambiguation)
 Riise, surname
 Risa (disambiguation)
 Rise Again (disambiguation)
 Risen (disambiguation)
 Rize (disambiguation)